United States President George Washington appointed 39 Article III United States federal judges during his presidency, which lasted from April 30, 1789 to March 4, 1797. The first group of Washington's appointments—two justices of the Supreme Court of the United States and ten district court judges—began service two days after Congress passed the Judiciary Act of 1789, which formally established the federal judiciary. Washington's last court appointee received his commission twelve days before the end of Washington's presidency.

As the first president, Washington was responsible for appointing the entire Supreme Court; he appointed a record eleven justices, including two Chief Justices who were confirmed from outside the Court and one former Justice named as Chief Justice by a recess appointment, but not ultimately confirmed to the position. Additionally, Washington nominated Robert H. Harrison, who declined to serve, and nominated William Cushing for elevation to Chief Justice, who likewise declined.

Since there were no sitting justices at the beginning of Washington's term, he had the unique opportunity to fill the entire body of United States federal judges with his selections. Despite this, Washington appointed only 28 judges to the United States district courts, due to the smaller size of the judiciary at the time; there were far fewer states, most states had a single district court, and each district had a single judge assigned to it. Because intermediate federal appellate courts had not yet been established, this, combined with the Supreme Court appointments, constituted the total number of federal judicial appointments made by Washington. The number is roughly 10% of the record 376 judges appointed by Ronald Reagan from 1981 to 1989, when the judiciary was much larger, and less than 5% of the number of active federal judges serving as of July 2010. Richard Peters Jr. served for over 36 years, the longest of Washington's appointments.

Washington appointed a small number of Article IV territorial judges. He appointed Samuel Holden Parsons, John Cleves Symmes, George Turner and Rufus Putnam to the court of the Northwest Territory, Putnam being appointed to fill the vacancy caused by the death of Parsons. He appointed David Campbell, John McNairy and Joseph Anderson to the court of the Southwest Territory. After the Southwest Territory was admitted to the union as the State of Tennessee, McNairy would go on to serve as its first United States District Judge.

As no Article I legislative courts existed during Washington's administration, he made no judicial appointments under Article I. The first court created under Article I, the United States Court of Claims, would not be established until 1855, under the administration of President Franklin Pierce.

Additionally, the District of Columbia judiciary would not exist until the passage of the District of Columbia Organic Act of 1801 under President John Adams.

United States Supreme Court justices

District courts

Notes

Renominations

References
General

 
 

Specific

Judicial appointments
Washington